Otto Franke is the name of:

Otto Franke (sinologist) (1863–1946), German historian of China
Otto Franke (politician) (1877–1953), German Communist politician and labor activist

See also
Otto Frank (1889–1980), German businessman
Otto Frank (physiologist) (1865–1944), German physiologist
Otto Frankel (1900–1998), Austrian-born Australian geneticist